Goosebumps SlappyWorld is a series of Goosebumps books by author R. L. Stine.

Description
The series was launched for the 25th anniversary of the Goosebumps franchise and features Slappy the Dummy as the narrator and/or primary antagonist of each book.

R. L. Stine signed a new contract with Scholastic to write an additional six Goosebumps books in 2018.

Books
{| class="wikitable" style="width:100%;"
|-
!  style="width:30px; background:#58c035; color:#fff;"|# !!  style="background:#58c035;color:#fff;"|Title !!  style="width:160px; background:#58c035; color:#fff;"|Original published date !! style="background:#58c035;color:#fff;"|Pages !!  style="width:120px; background:#58c035;"|ISBN

|}

References

External links
 at Scholastic Press

Book series introduced in 2017
Goosebumps